A municipal by-election was held in Vancouver, British Columbia, Canada on October 14, 2017. One empty seat on city council and all the seats on the Vancouver school board were filled.

These elections were held outside the normal four-year schedule. Unlike in full elections, voters were only asked to elect one councillor and nine school board trustees rather than the full complement of elected municipal positions. The by-election was necessary for two reasons: the resignation of Vision Vancouver councillor Geoff Meggs from City Council to become BC Premier John Horgan's chief of staff and the desire of the new provincial NDP government to reconstitute the Vancouver School Board, whose elected members had all been fired by the previous BC Liberal government.

The school board election marked the first time a OneCity candidate was elected to any position in Vancouver's elected government.

Background
The by-election was called to replace the single vacant council seat, due to Geoff Meggs' departure to take on the role of Premier John Horgan's chief of staff. The by-election was also meant to elect a new board of school trustees, who had been dismissed by provincial education minister Mike Bernier after failing to pass a balanced budget and allegations of workplace harassment arose.

Nomination process

Non-Partisan Association
On September 6, 2017, the Non-Partisan Association held a nomination meeting to decide their representative for the lone Council position. Hector Bremner, the successful nominee, beat out former school trustee Penny Noble and former leader of the Cedar Party Glen Chernen. Candidates for the five school trustee positions were announced at the same time.

Green Party
Pete Fry, who had unsuccessfully ran for Council in 2014, was the first confirmed nominee for council by any major political party in Vancouver. The Greens also nominated former incumbent Janet Fraser to run for re-election alongside Judy Zaichkowsky and Estrellita Gonzalez.

Results

Councillor

School Board trustees

Each voter could cast up to nine votes.

(I) denotes incumbents prior to the dismissal of all nine School Board trustees by Education Minister Mike Bernier in October 2016.

References

2017 elections in Canada
Municipal elections in Vancouver
2017 in British Columbia
2010s in Vancouver